Jump Brook is a river that converges with Bear Kill by Grand Gorge, New York.

References 

Rivers of New York (state)
Rivers of Delaware County, New York